Valentina Ciurina (born 30 August 1978) is a Moldovan biathlete. She competed at the 2002 Winter Olympics and the 2006 Winter Olympics.

References

1978 births
Living people
Biathletes at the 2002 Winter Olympics
Biathletes at the 2006 Winter Olympics
Moldovan female biathletes
Olympic biathletes of Moldova
Place of birth missing (living people)